Ric Wake  is an American record producer who has won four Grammy Awards and two Oscar Awards. During his tenure as staff producer with Sony Music Entertainment he has worked with vocalists such as Celine Dion, Whitney Houston, Lucero, Taylor Dayne, Mariah Carey, Jessica Simpson, Anastacia, Barry Manilow, Marc Anthony and Jennifer Lopez. He has worked with Greek composer Yanni to help produce Yanni Voices.

Credits
Brie Larson - "Life After You"
Dee Snider's Widowmaker - Blood and Bullets
Monica - “Just Another Girl” 
Diana Ross
Mariah Carey
Taylor Dayne - "Tell It to My Heart", "Don't Rush Me", "With Every Beat of My Heart", "Love Will Lead You Back"
Go West
Anastacia
Celine Dion
Jennifer Rush
Sheena Easton
Kathy Troccoli - "Pure Attraction"
Jennifer Lopez
Jessica Simpson - "Sweetest Sin"
Barry Manilow
Jon Secada
Anna Vissi
Clay Aiken
Thalía - “Baby I’m In Love”
Paulina Rubio
Lucero "Mi Destino" and "Indispensable" 
TNT  "Realized Fantasies"
David Bisbal
Mýa
Marc Anthony
Dixie Chicks
Whitney Houston
Lou Reed
Coco Lee - Exposed and Just No Other Way
Delta Goodrem- "Born To Try"
Yanni Voices
Blue Zone
Inspirato
Play
Dream
Dana Dawson - "3 Is Family"

References

External links

Ric Wake on Discogs.com

Place of birth missing (living people)
Year of birth missing (living people)
Living people
American record producers
Grammy Award winners
Musicians from London
A&R people